Kawadipally is a village in Ranga Reddy district in Telangana, India. It falls under Hayathnagar mandal.

Kawadipally is a village in Hayathnagar Mandal, Rangareddi District, Telangana State. Kawadipally is 8.3 km distance from its Mandal Main Town Hayathnagar. Kawadipally is 63.6 km distance from its District Main City Rangareddi. And 23 km distance from its State Main City Hyderabad.
The village is famous for 400 years old SRI SRI SRI KODANDA RAMACHANDHRASWAMY Temple which has been recently renovated. The temple also includes few upalayas like... Vinayaka Temple, Hanuman Temple, Srimannarayana sametha Ashtalaxmi Temple, Subramanya swamy Temple and
Navagrahas. Every Sri Rama Navami - Kalyanotsavam, Rathothsavam and Chakratheertham are performed by the archakas.
Devotees from distant places visit and take blessings of the Lord Sri Seetha Ramachandra Swamy.

Villages in Ranga Reddy district